Auguste-Hyacinthe Debay (Nantes 2 April 1804 – 24 March 1865 Paris) was a French painter and sculptor.

Life and career
Auguste-Hyacinthe Debay was born in Nantes, France on 2 April 1804. His father, Joseph Jan Baptiste de Bay, 1829, was an eminent sculptor who worked in Paris and locally in Nantes. Debay learned sculpting from his father at an early age, but started his career as a historical painter. On August 28, 1817, he was admitted to the Ecole des Beaux-Arts and exhibited his first portraits to The Salon at the age of thirteen. After studying under Gros, he obtained the Prix de Rome in 1823. Soon after this he gave up painting for sculpture, which he studied under his father, and in which he was successful. Some of his historical paintings are displayed at the Versailles.

Gallery

References

Attribution:

External links

1804 births
1865 deaths
19th-century French painters
French male painters
French architectural sculptors
Artists from Nantes
Prix de Rome for painting
Pupils of Antoine-Jean Gros
19th-century French sculptors
French male sculptors
19th-century French male artists